Eye of the Stalker (a.k.a. Moment of Truth: Eye of the Stalker and Eye of the Stalker: A Moment of Truth Story) is a 1995 American made-for-television thriller film directed by Reza Badiyi. Based on a true story, the film is an original Moment of Truth movie that stars Brooke Langton, Joanna Cassidy and Jere Burns.

Plot
Beth Knowlton (Brooke Langton) is a young art student who is majoring in photography at a college in Phoenix, Arizona. Stephen Primes (Jere Burns) teaches law at the same university, and becomes infatuated with Beth at first sight. To get close to her, he hires her to take some photos of him. After the shoot, he sends a stuffed bear to her home as a gift. Beth is not impressed with Stephen's unwanted actions, and firmly tries to be clear that she is not interested since she is already dating Kyle Kennedy (Woolson). Despite her refusals, Stephen persists, breaking up her relationship and begins telling people that he and Beth have become engaged. This gains the attention of Beth's mother Martha (Cassidy), who tries (but fails) to find a legal manner for Stephen to leave Beth alone.

After a while, Stephen's stalking become increasingly awkward and obsessive, when he leaves Beth cut-out notes and one day even attempts to strangle her in a darkroom. Martha encourages Beth to move in with her and they both press charges, but the police are unable to arrest Stephen without a sign of evidence. Immediately after moving in, Martha and Beth find their home burglarized and a message "Obey or die" written on a bathroom mirror. Knowing how far Stephen will go, Martha sends Beth off to a relative in Denver, Colorado under a fake name.

Stephen becomes enraged when he loses sight of Beth and mistakenly becomes preoccupied with another Elizabeth Knowlton (known as Liz). Thinking he has tracked Beth down, Liz receives packages in her mail from Stephen containing threats as well as a video of him and Beth. When Stephen attempts to break into her home one night, Liz sets out to locate Beth after recognizing him from the video. They both join forces to catch Stephen in the act, using Beth as bait. Liz gives Beth a loaded gun as an extra precaution. Beth eventually uses the gun when she sees Stephen holding Martha and threatening her with a knife. After tricking Stephen into thinking that she will leave with him, Beth grabs the gun and holds the psychopath at gunpoint. Stephen drops the knife but rants and raves that Beth wouldn't hurt him and she loves him. Beth angrily denounces Stephen and declares he will not control her life anymore. Stephen persists in his delusion, until Beth fires two warning shots causing a shocked Stephen to back down and surrender. Stephen then states in a resigned tone that Beth is "just like all the rest", giving the impression that he had obsessed over and stalked other girls in the past.

The film ends as Stephen is finally arrested, and Martha and Beth, relieved that he will be out of their lives forever, embrace each other as a caption says, "According to recent Congressional testimony, an estimated 5% of the U.S. female population will be victimized by a stalker. In response, all 50 states and the District of Columbia have passed anti-stalking legislation."

Cast
Brooke Langton as Elizabeth 'Beth' Knowlton
Joanna Cassidy as Judge Martha Knowlton
Jere Burns as Stephen Primes
Dennis Burkley as Danny Zerbo
Lucinda Jenney as Elizabeth 'Liz' Knowlton
Michael Woolson as Kyle Kennedy
Conor O'Farrell as Officer Lane
Barbara Tarbuck as Judge Paula Castanon
John Bennett Perry as Duncan Emerson
Lindsey Ginter as Officer Weldon
Jonathan Ward as Neil
Rick Worthy as Eric
Michael Cavanaugh as Judge Warren Curtis
James MacDonald as Gerry
Matthew Faison as College Dean

External links

Official website

1995 television films
1995 films
1990s thriller drama films
American thriller drama films
Crime films based on actual events
Films set in Phoenix, Arizona
NBC network original films
Films about stalking
American drama television films
1990s English-language films
1990s American films